Soviet architecture usually refers to one of two architecture styles emblematic of the Soviet Union:

 Constructivist architecture, prominent in the 1920s and early 1930s
 Stalinist architecture, prominent in the 1930s through 1950s